Salmas County is in West Azerbaijan province, Iran. The capital of the county is the city of Salmas. At the 2006 census, the county's population was 180,708 in 40,298 households. The following census in 2011 counted 192,591 people in 48,872 households. At the 2016 census, the county's population was 196,546 in 53,907 households. The county is populated largely by Azeris and Kurds. A few thousand Armenians live in the district, and comprise the second largest population of minorities in the province after Urmia County.

Administrative divisions

The population history of Salmas County's administrative divisions over three consecutive censuses is shown in the following table. The latest census shows two districts, seven rural districts, and two cities.

References

 

Counties of West Azerbaijan Province